Oak Hill Lake may refer to:

 Oak Hill Lake (Halifax), lake in Halifax Regional Municipality, Nova Scotia, Canada
 Oak Hill Lake (Guysborough), lake in Guysborough District, Nova Scotia, Canada